Alfredo Sebastián Ramúa (born September 4, 1986 in Argentina) is an Argentine footballer currently playing for Cusco FC of the Peruvian Liga 1.

References

External links
 
 
 

1986 births
Living people
Argentine footballers
Argentine expatriate footballers
Newell's Old Boys footballers
Aldosivi footballers
C.D. Olmedo footballers
Real Arroyo Seco footballers
Sportivo Las Parejas footballers
C.D. Técnico Universitario footballers
Aragua FC players
Real Garcilaso footballers
Sporting Cristal footballers
Colegio Nacional Iquitos footballers
Cusco FC footballers
Primera Nacional players
Peruvian Primera División players
Venezuelan Primera División players
Ecuadorian Serie A players
Argentine expatriate sportspeople in Peru
Argentine expatriate sportspeople in Venezuela
Argentine expatriate sportspeople in Ecuador
Expatriate footballers in Peru
Expatriate footballers in Venezuela
Expatriate footballers in Ecuador
Association football midfielders
Sportspeople from Santa Fe Province